Caltiki – The Immortal Monster is a 1959 black-and-white science fiction-horror film. The film's storyline concerns a team of archaeologists investigating Mayan ruins, who come across a creature that is a shapeless, amorphous blob. They manage to defeat it using fire, while keeping a sample of the creature. Meanwhile, a comet, which previously passed near the Earth around the time of the collapse of the Mayan civilization, is due to return, raising the possibility of a connection between the creature and the comet.

After the success of their film Hercules (1958), Galatea Film began production on films in other genres that they hoped would entice the international market, which led to Riccardo Freda being hired to direct Caltiki – The Immortal Monster. Freda left the project during filming, later explaining that he wanted to give his friend Mario Bava, who had been hired as the film's cinematographer and special effects artist, a chance to direct and earn more on the project. In interviews given long after the release of the film, both Freda and Bava gave conflicting opinions on who should be considered the real director of Caltiki. Various historians and ministerial papers suggest that Bava did create a large amount of footage of the film involving death scenes, the monster, matching shots and special effects scenes.

The film was released in Italy on 8 August 1959, where it grossed less than Bava's and Freda's previous genre collaboration I Vampiri.

Plot
A delirious archaeologist stumbles into his group's camp without his partner, both of whom have been exploring a nearby cave. He quickly goes mad, requiring hospitalization. Their interest piqued by this strange turn of events, the group sets out for the cave.

Once there, they find a deep pool of water and a large statue of Caltiki, the vengeful Mayan goddess who was ceremonially presented with human sacrifices. Hoping to find artifacts, the group sends one of their own down into the pool. At the bottom, he finds a menagerie of skeletons clad in gold jewelry. He comes back up, clutching as much gold as he can carry. Although the others tell him not to go down again, he insists on doing so, suggesting that they could become wealthy from the treasures below. Relenting, they let him descend once more. As he collects more and more treasure, his cable to the surface suddenly begins to move erratically. Fearing for his safety, the group pulls him back to the surface, only to find that his flesh has been reduced to a decayed mass over his skeleton upon removing his face mask.

Moments later, the shapeless creature that attacked him rears up from the pool, attempting to digest anyone within reach. One of the group members is briefly caught by the arm but is then rescued. As the team escapes, the shapeless mass begins to crawl out of the cave. Nearby, there is a tanker truck full of gasoline. One of the scientists drives the tanker directly into the moving mass, which violently explodes and sets fire to the blob, destroying it.

The team returns to Mexico City to take their injured colleague to a hospital. Still on his arm is a small piece of the blob, which is slowly digesting him. The surgeons carefully remove the creature, wrapping it up. They find that his arm is nothing more than a few moist scraps of flesh still connected to the underlying bones. After further experimenting on the creature, scientists discover that it is a unicellular bacterium that quickly grows when in the presence of radiation. A comet emitting radiation that crosses Earth's path only once every 850 years is rapidly approaching. At the comet's closest approach to Earth, the remaining piece of the blob removed during the surgery begins expanding to an enormous size and reproducing. Unfortunately, the extracted sample of the creature is stored in the home of expedition member Dr. John Fielding.

While attempting to convince the Mexican government to send its army to destroy the reproducing blobs, Fielding is arrested but manages to escape. A colleague finally convinces the authorities to sound an alarm because the multiplying creatures will soon be beyond their control. The government marshals a regiment of soldiers equipped with flamethrowers and jeeps and sends them to Dr. Fielding's home. Upon arrival, they find that the amorphous blobs have continued to multiply and have overrun the house and grounds. Dr. Fielding's wife and child have hidden on a second-floor window ledge to escape being devoured. Fielding arrives just in time to save them, just as the arrayed soldiers lay waste to the creatures with torrents of fire.

Cast
 John Merivale as Dr. John Fielding
 Didi Perego as Ellen Fielding
 Gérard Herter as Max Gunther
 Daniela Rocca as Linda
 Giacomo Rossi-Stuart as Prof. Rodriguez's assistant
 Daniele Vargas as Bob (expedition member)
 Vittorio André as Prof. Rodriguez
 Nerio Bernardi as Police inspector
 Arturo Dominici as Nieto (expedition member)

Production

Background and development
After the release of I Vampiri, director Riccardo Freda took on another new genre, the science fiction film, with his next genre film Caltiki - The Immortal Monster. Very few sound films in Italy were science fiction films at this point, with Sergio Corbucci's comedy film Baracca e burattini made in 1954 and Steno's Totò nella luna and The Day the Sky Exploded from 1958. Caltiki was produced by Nello Santi for Galatea Film, who were interested in exploring new genres of film after the success of Hercules (1957), and produced Caltiki with foreign markets in mind. Although not mentioned in any credits or ministerial papers, European sources list the involvement of the French company Climax Film in the production. Prints of the U.S. version of the film credit it as a "Samuel Schneider presentation", leading to some sources speculating that the film was an Italian-American co-production.

Director

Freda was angered by the way producers and other filmmakers had his cinematographer Mario Bava work on previous films, specifically films of Pietro Francisci. Freda concocted a way to push Bava into the director's chair of Freda's next film, Caltiki – The Immortal Monster; he left the project early. Bava had been hired again as the film's cinematographer, while Filippo Sanjust was hired as the film's screenwriter, having  co-written Freda's previous film Beatrice Cenci (1956). Freda also contributed to the script without credit.

Specific information on how much Freda and Bava directed the film differ between interviews and recollections. Freda noted with an interview with Luigi Cozzi in 1971 that he "left it when there were just two days of shooting left. I did shoot it yes, but it's Bava's type of film. I don't enclose it in my body of work. The only thing I remember with pleasure about it are the statues that decorated the sets: I sculpted them myself." Bava described Caltiki – The Immortal Monster as "my very first film", while noting that Freda had fled the set "because everything was falling to pieces. I managed to carry it out, patching it up here and there". Cozzi commented on his interview with Freda in 2004, stating that his own words were misinterpreted and that "the truth is only one: the director of Calitiki il mostro immortale is Riccardo Freda, full stop. Mario Bava did take care of the cinematography, the special effects and directed the scenes with the miniatures (that is, mostly the tanks....), and in addition to that he filmed some shots of soldiers with flame throwers. That's all, and of course it cannot be enough to say that Bava directed that movie." Cozzi also stated that Bava spoke about the film, stating that "I did not direct Caltiki. The director of that movie is Freda. Only at a certain point, after principal shooting ended, Freda started editing the picture and then he had a big argument with the producer [...] Then Freda walked out." Bava's statement from Cozzi then noted that Bava finished some special effects shot, scenes with soldiers with flame throwers for the ending of the film and declared "that does not mean I was the director of Caltiki: that is a Riccardo Freda film." According to Bava's biographer Tim Lucas, Freda's walk-off left "two or three weeks of filming", leaving Bava to shoot over 100 special effects shots for a 76-minute long production.

Massimo De Rita, who worked as a unit manager for Galatea, spent time on the set of Caltiki and opined that "at 90 percent Bava was also the director of Caltiki. Freda was away, he didn't know anything about what Bava was contriving." De Rita noted that Bava told actors what to do and that Bava shot all the connecting shots with the monster and all the death scenes. Ministerial papers also note the Bava and Freda's roles in the film. The final balance in the film assigns Freda 5,000,000 lire, instead of the initial 6,000,000 and that Bava was paid 6.250 million lire, instead of his initial 3,000,000.

Release
Caltiki - The Immortal Monster was released theatrically in Italy on 8 August 1959 where it was distributed by Lux Film. In Italy the film was less successful than Freda's and Bava's film I Vampiri, which had grossed ₤125.3 million Italian lire. Caltiki grossed a total of 94.15 million lire domestically.

The film was distributed theatrically in the U.S. in September 1960 by Allied Artists as Caltiki – The Immortal Monster. The English-language dub of the film was created in New York by Titra Studios, which dubbed many Italian films from this period. It was released in the U.K. in 1962.

Home media
Caltiki - The Immortal Monster was published as a photonovel in the magazine I Vostri Film in the 1 July 1962 issue. The film was released on DVD and Blu-ray by Arrow Video on 11 April 2017. Arrow's release features both Italian and English audio tracks, two separate audio commentaries by Bava historians Tim Lucas and Troy Howarth, an interview with critic Kim Newman about the film's place in the history of monster films, several archival featurettes, and an alternative "full aperture" presentation of the film that contains more visual information than was present in the original theatrical prints, particularly with regard to Bava's visual effects shots.

Critical reception 
From contemporary reviews, The Monthly Film Bulletin commented that "phony sets, bad acting and limitations of a small budget seriously hamper the first half" and that "once the monster asserts itself things begin to liven up." The review concluded that the film was "so incredibly banal that it almost entertains." Wanada Hale of the New York Daily News referred to Caltiki as a "feeble horror film" and that "Not only the story is bad; so are the production, the direction, the dubbing and the acting".

Among retrospective reviews, Bruce Eder of AllMovie gave the film a generally positive review, calling it "a neat and compelling science fiction-horror amalgam, squeezing cosmology together with archaeology and myth to create a genuinely fascinating and original thriller." In Phil Hardy's book Science Fiction (1984), a review described the film as a  "minor outing [...] though the acting is routine and the script leaden, Bava injects a few stylish flourishes." Slant Magazine stated that the film "remains an impressive showcase for Bava's inimitable skills behind the camera, in particular his uncanny ability to craft moody atmosphere and some extremely grisly imagery (for 1959, anyhow) out of the simplest and most frugal of cinematic means."

See also
 List of Italian films of 1959
 List of horror films of the 1950s
 List of science fiction films of the 1950s

References

Citations

Bibliography

 
 
 
 
 
 
 
 
 
 Warren, Bill. Keep Watching the Skies: Science Fiction Films of the Fifties, 21st Century Edition. 2009. Jefferson, North Carolina: McFarland & Company,(First Editions Vol. 1, 1982, Vol. 2, 1986).

External links 
 
 

1959 films
1959 horror films
1950s science fiction horror films
Italian science fiction horror films
French science fiction horror films
1950s monster movies
Films directed by Riccardo Freda
Films directed by Mario Bava
Films set in Mexico City
Allied Artists films
1950s Italian films
1950s French films